= Bielenda =

Polish cosmetics company

BIELENDA Kosmetyki Naturalne (Natural Cosmetics)
- Industry: Cosmetics
- Founded: 1990
- Founder: Barbara Bielenda
- Headquarters: Kraków, Poland
- Area served: Worldwide
- Parent: MIMI Group

Bielenda, or BIELENDA Kosmetyki Naturalne is a Polish family cosmetics company founded in 1990 by Barbara Bielenda. The company sells products for professional and consumer use, for face, body and hair care. These products include creams, masks, scrubs, balms, slimming cosmetics, sun care products, personal care products, hair care and hairstyling preparations as well as aromatherapy bath oils. The company is working to create a network of cosmetic and aesthetic centers, offering beauty treatments and cosmetic therapies. All Bielenda products are developed and produced in Poland.

The company sells its products in France, Germany, UK, Latvia, Montenegro, Slovenia, Slovakia, Czech Republic, Hungary, Austria, Lithuania, Estonia, Sweden, Finland, US, Canada, Greece, Ukraine and Kazakhstan.
